A Woman Called Moses is a 1978 American television miniseries based on the life of Harriet Tubman, the escaped African American slave who helped to organize the Underground Railroad, and who led dozens of African Americans from enslavement in the Southern United States to freedom in the Northern states and Canada.

Narrated by Orson Welles, the production was broadcast on the NBC television network on December 11 and 12, 1978. Tubman was portrayed by Cicely Tyson.

Music
The soundtrack music was by Coleridge-Taylor Perkinson and soul music composer/arranger/singer Van McCoy contributed some music to the series, which was featured on a soundtrack album released by MCA Records.

Cast

Video releases
The miniseries was first released on VHS on September 29, 1992, followed by a DVD release on February 3, 2001.

See also
 List of films featuring slavery
 The Quest for Freedom, 1992 film about Harriet Tubman
 Harriet, 2019 film about Tubman

References

External links
 
 
 

1978 films
1970s biographical drama films
Television series based on actual events
Films about race and ethnicity
1970s American television miniseries
Films set in the 1850s
Films set in Maryland
Films based on American novels
American biographical drama films
Works about American slavery
Works about the Underground Railroad
Cultural depictions of Harriet Tubman
Films directed by Paul Wendkos
Films about American slavery
NBC network original films
1978 drama films
American drama television films
1970s American films
1970s English-language films